Roger Kramer (born ca. 1939 in Oklahoma City, Oklahoma) is an American athlete and former professional Canadian Football League (CFL) player who played nine seasons in the CFL for three teams. He was named CFL All-Star in 1963 and 1964. He played college football at Kalamazoo College from 1957–59. He is the father of actor Eric Allan Kramer, and remained in Canada following his CFL Career.

References

1939 births
Living people
American players of Canadian football
Calgary Stampeders players
Canadian football offensive linemen
Montreal Alouettes players
Ottawa Rough Riders players
Sportspeople from Oklahoma City